Emanuele D'Anna (born 23 May 1982) is an Italian footballer who plays for A.S.D. Nocerina 1910.

Club career
A Milan youth product, he was loaned to Chieti of Serie C2 (later promoted to Serie C1). In July 2003, he moved to Piacenza which newly relegated to Serie B in joint-ownership bid. In July 2005, he moved to another Serie B club, Arezzo. After just played 17 league matches in a season, D'Anna was loaned to Serie C1 clubs, Juve Stabia and Pisa. Arezzo relegated to Serie C1 in summer 2007, and Pisa signed D'Anna permanently. After a season with Pisa, he moved to Chievo on 4 July 2008. On January 31, 2009 he was sent back on loan to Pisa following a spell at Chievo Verona, where he found playing time hard to come by.

D'Anna sign for Benevento in July 2009.

Honours and awards
Serie C1: Third Place and promotion playoff winner (2007)
Serie C2: Runner up and promotion playoff winner (2001)

References

External links
gazzetta.it

1982 births
Sportspeople from the Province of Avellino
Footballers from Campania
Living people
Italian footballers
Association football midfielders
A.C. Milan players
S.S. Chieti Calcio players
Piacenza Calcio 1919 players
S.S. Arezzo players
S.S. Juve Stabia players
Pisa S.C. players
A.C. ChievoVerona players
Benevento Calcio players
A.S. Gubbio 1910 players
Cosenza Calcio players
Casertana F.C. players
S.S. Maceratese 1922 players
A.S.D. Nocerina 1910 players
Serie A players
Serie B players
Serie C players
Serie D players